The 1991 Pro Bowl was the NFL's 41st annual all-star game which featured the outstanding performers from the 1990 season. The game was played on Sunday, February 3, 1991, at Aloha Stadium in Honolulu, Hawaii before a crowd of 50,345. The final score was AFC 23, NFC 21.

Art Shell of the Los Angeles Raiders led the AFC team against an NFC team coached by San Francisco 49ers head coach George Seifert. The referee was Gordon McCarter.

Quarterback Jim Kelly of the Buffalo Bills was named the game's Most Valuable Player. Players on the winning AFC team received $10,000 apiece while the NFC participants each took home $5,000.

AFC roster

Offense

Defense

Special teams

NFC roster

Offense

Defense

Special teams

References

External links

Pro Bowl
Pro Bowl
Pro Bowl
Pro Bowl
Pro Bowl
American football competitions in Honolulu
February 1991 sports events in the United States